Pezzi is an Italian surname. Notable people with the surname include:

Andrea Pezzi  (born 1973), Italian TV presenter, writer and entrepreneur
Enrico Pezzi (general) (1897–1942), Italian Air Force general
Enrico Pezzi (footballer) (born 1989), Italian footballer
Giulietta Pezzi (1810–1878), Italian writer and journalist
Jürgen Pezzi, Italian luger
Luciano Pezzi (1921–1998), Italian cyclist
Mario Pezzi (aviator) (1898 – 1968), Italian pilot
Mario Pezzi (priest) (born 1941), leader in the Neocatechumenal Way.
Paolo Pezzi (born 1960), Italian Roman Catholic archbishop

Other
Due pezzi (Berio), composition for violin and piano, written by Luciano Berio 

Italian-language surnames